Enego is a town and comune in the province of Vicenza, Veneto, north-eastern Italy. It is west of SS47 state road.

It was once the seat of a castle used by the Ezzelino family, now demolished.

Sources

Cities and towns in Veneto